Magheracross is a townland and civil parish in County Fermanagh, Northern Ireland. It extends in area from just north of Enniskillen to the border with County Tyrone. There  is also a small enclave in County Tyrone.

 The Parish has a rich history and the main town in the parish is Ballinamallard.

Ballinamallard railway station opened on 19 August 1854, but was finally closed on 1 October 1957.

By 1910 the population was recorded at 283.

Landmarks
Notable landmarks in the parish include:
Ballinamallard, COI, church built in 1770
Ballinamallard, Weslyn Meeting house
St Mary's, Catholic built 1770
An Iron Age henge and ring fort.

Townlands of the Parish
Ballinamallard, main town of the parish
Cavanalough Glebe  is a locality and townland in Magheracross, located at 54° 24' 19" N, 7° 33' 20" W in the Barony of Tirkennedy The townland is 398.88 acres in area.
Coa, County Fermanagh
Cooltrain  is a townland in Magheracross civil parish, County Fermanagh. It is located at 54° 23' 20" N, 7° 33' 46" W. and is 159.89 acres in area.
Currin, is a locality and townland, located at 54° 24' 7" N, 7° 35' 17" W. Currin is 327.46 acres in area.
Drumcreen, is a locality and townland in Magheracross Northern Ireland, located at 54° 25' 28" N, 7° 34' 38" W. The townland of Drumcreen is 123.37 acres in area.
Drummurry  is a townland in Magheracross civil parish, County Fermanagh, Northern Ireland. The topography is undulating and sighltly marshy. and landuse is predominantly agricultural but includes newer urban development on the outskirts of Ballinamallard township. It is located at 54° 25' 9" N, 7° 36' 14" W. and is 165.91 acres in area.
Drumsloe, is a locality and townland located at 54° 24′ 30.39″ N, 7° 34′ 17.41″ W, in Magheracross parish. Drumsloe is 240.77 acres in area.  It has been known as early as 1609AD when it was known as Dromslo, a name that may be from Druim Sluagh meaning ridge of the hosts. The Griffith's Valuation of 1863 indicates a school was located in Drumsloe. Significant landmarks include drumsloe lough, where illegal distillery on Drumsloe Island was operated for some time in the early 19th century.
 Salloon is a locality and townland in Magheracross civil parish. Salloon is in the Barony of Tirkennedy and is located at 54° 25' 49" N, 7° 35' 35" W and is 222.08 acres in area. A large townland, Salloon takes in large areas of rural farmland but also includes about a third of the township of Ballinamallard.
Salary, Northern Ireland is a townland and locality in Magheracross civil parish, County Fermanagh, Northern Ireland. It is located at 54° 24' 53" N, 7° 36' 47" W. Salary is in the Barony of Tirkennedy and is 212.98 acres in area.
Sidaire townland in Magheracross civil parish is located at 54° 25' 27" N, 7° 37' 9" W.

Religion
Religion has played a large part in the History of Magheracross. About 450AD the local parish was said to have been founded by St Patrick and about 550AD  St Columba passed thorough the area. In the 7th century Laisrén mac Nad Froích founded a community on nearby Devenish Island. Another Monastery was built in the middle ages in the Parish, and other establishments built at nearby Trory. In 1769 John Wesley visited the district bringing Methodism and nearby Coa Chapel was built in 1770.

In the early 20th century further religious movements swept the district.

Note
The area should not be confused with Magheracross in Antrim or Maghera Cross in Limerick.

See also
List of civil parishes of County Fermanagh
List of civil parishes of County Tyrone

References

Civil parishes of County Fermanagh
Civil parishes of County Tyrone
Townlands of County Fermanagh